Pimenov (masculine) or Pimenova (feminine) is a surname of Russian origin.  People with the surname include:

 Kristina Pimenova (b. 2005), a Russian child model and actress; daughter of Ruslan Pimenov
 Mikhail Pimenov (b. 1983), a Russian professional football player
 Nikolay Pimenov (b. 1958), a Russian former rower
 Ruslan Pimenov (b. 1981), a retired Russian football player, father of Kristina Pimenova
 Sergei Pimenov (b. 1969), a retired Russian professional football player
 Stepan Pimenov (1784-1833), Russian sculptor
 Viktor Pimenov (d. 1996), a cameraman for Vaynakh Television, killed reporting on war in Chechnya
 Yuriy Pimenov (1958–2019), a Russian former rower
 Vyacheslav Pimenov (b. 1991), a professional Russian triathlete

Russian-language surnames